Athina Petropulu (born in Kalamata Greece) is a Distinguished Professor in the Electrical and Computer Engineering (ECE) Department at Rutgers, The State University of New Jersey. She has made contributions in signal processing, wireless communications and networks, radar systems, etc., and has received many awards and honors in these areas.

Education 
Prof. Petropulu received the Diploma in Electrical Engineering from the National Technical University of Athens, Greece in 1986, the M.Sc. degree in Electrical and Computer Engineering (ECE) in 1988 and the Ph.D. degree in Electrical and Computer Engineering in 1991 both from Northeastern University, Boston, where she was supervised by Prof. C. L. Max Nikias.

Professional career 
From 1992 to 2010, Athina was a professor in the ECE department at Drexel University. Then she joined the Rutgers ECE Department in 2010 as a professor, and served as chair of the department during 2010-2016. Now she is a Distinguished Professor in Rutgers ECE. In addition, she held appointment as a visiting scholar at SUPELEC (1999-2000), Universite' Paris Sud, Princeton University (2007-2008) and University of Southern California.

Prof. Petropulu is a Fellow of both IEEE and AAAS, and was elected as the president of the IEEE Signal Processing Society (SPS) in the term of 2022-2023. She is also a former Editor-in-Chief of the IEEE Transactions on Signal Processing in the term of 2009-2011. Moreover, Prof. Petropulu has served as General Chair or General Co-Chair of some well-known academic conferences, like IEEE International Workshop on Signal Processing Advances in Wireless Communications (SPAWC), International Conference on Acoustics Speech and Signal Processing (ICASSP), etc. She was also Distinguished Lecturer of both IEEE SPS (2017-2018) and IEEE Aerospace and Electronic Systems Society (2019-2020).

Other Awards and honors 
 IEEE Signal Processing Society Young Author Best Paper Award (with F. Liu) (2021)
 Barry Carlton Best Paper Award, IEEE Aerospace and Electronic Systems Society (2021)
 IEEE Signal Processing Society Young Author Best Paper Award (with B. Li) (2020)
 Member-at-Large, IEEE Signal Processing Board of Governors (2018-2019)
 IEEE Signal Processing Society Meritorious Service Award (2012)
 Great Master, University of Electronic Science and Technology of China (2012)
 IEEE Signal Processing Society VP Conferences (2006-2009)
 IEEE Signal Processing Magazine Best Paper Award (2005)
 Member-at-Large, IEEE Signal Processing Board of Governors (2004-2005)
 Presidential Faculty Fellow Award (The White House/NSF), 1995

Books 
Higher-Order Spectra Analysis: a Nonlinear Signal Processing Framework, Prentice-Hall, Inc., 1993 (with C. L. Max Nikias)

See also 
 Homepage
 Prof. Athina Petropulu's Google Scholar

References 

Rutgers University faculty

Year of birth missing (living people)
Living people
People from Kalamata
National Technical University of Athens alumni